Westcreek is an unincorporated community and a census-designated place (CDP) located in and governed by Douglas County, Colorado, United States. The CDP is a part of the Denver–Aurora–Lakewood, CO Metropolitan Statistical Area. The population of the Westcreek CDP was 129 at the United States Census 2010. The Sedalia post office (Zip Code 80135) serves the area.

Geography
Westcreek is located in southwestern Douglas County. It is in the valley of West Creek, a north-flowing tributary of Horse Creek and part of the South Platte River watershed.

Colorado State Highway 67 passes through the community, leading north down the West Creek/Horse Creek valley  to Deckers and southeast  to Woodland Park.

Demographics

Education
The Douglas County School District serves Westcreek.

See also

Outline of Colorado
Index of Colorado-related articles
State of Colorado
Colorado cities and towns
Colorado census designated places
Colorado counties
Douglas County, Colorado
List of statistical areas in Colorado
Front Range Urban Corridor
North Central Colorado Urban Area
Denver-Aurora-Boulder, CO Combined Statistical Area
Denver-Aurora-Broomfield, CO Metropolitan Statistical Area

References

External links

Westcreek, Colorado Mining Claims And Mines
Douglas County website

Census-designated places in Douglas County, Colorado
Census-designated places in Colorado
Denver metropolitan area